The EuroCup Women 2011–12 was the tenth edition of FIBA Europe's second-tier international competition for women's basketball clubs under such name. It ran from 2 November 2011 to 22 March 2012.

Dynamo Kursk won the competition beating Kayseri Kaski SK in the final by overcoming a 14-points first leg loss. It was the fourth time the EuroCup went to Russia, following Baltiyskaya Zvezda, Spartak Moscow Region and Dynamo Moscow's wins between 2004 and 2007.

Group stage

Group A

Group B

Group C

Group D

Group E

Group F

Group G

Group H

Round of 16

Quarter-finals

Semifinals

Final

References

EuroCup Women seasons
2011–12 in European women's basketball leagues